Damianos Sotheby's International Realty is a luxury Bahamas real estate firm founded in 1945 by Nicholas G. Damianos. This Bahamian company was originally named Damianos Realty, but had a name change when they acquired the Sotheby's International Realty franchise in 2005. Damianos Sotheby's International Realty is a member of the Bahamas Real Estate Association and the Bahamas MLS.

Franchise Story
Sotheby's Auction House was founded back in 1744 in London originally as an auctioneer of books. In 1976 Sotheby's International Realty was founded. The company operates as a franchise focusing on brokering and marketing of luxury real estate.

In February 2004, Realogy Holdings (NYSE: RLGY), a real estate franchising and provider of real estate brokerage entered into a long-term alliance with Sotheby's, the operator of the Auction House. The agreement provided for the licensing of the Sotheby’s International Realty name and the development of a full franchise system.

As of the end of 2013, the Sotheby's International Realty network had more than 14,500 sales associates located in 700 offices in 52 countries and territories worldwide.

References

Real estate companies established in 1945
Luxury real estate
Realogy brands
Real estate companies of the Bahamas